Guido Bargellini (1879–1963) was an Italian organic chemist. He specialized in natural product chemistry, in particular, flavonoid dyes and coumarins, and the compound santonin. He was admitted to the Accademia dei Lincei in 1946. The Bargellini reaction is named for him.

References 
 Eintrag bei treccani.it 

1879 births
1963 deaths
Italian chemists
Organic chemists